Crow Creek National Forest was established as the Crow Creek Forest Reserve in Wyoming by the General Land Office on October 10, 1900 with .  After the transfer of federal forests to the U.S. Forest Service in 1905, it became a National Forest on March 4, 1907. On July 1, 1908 it was combined with part of Medicine Bow National Forest to create Cheyenne National Forest. The name was discontinued, and the Cheyenne was renamed Medicine Bow in 1910.

References

External links
Forest History Society
Listing of the National Forests of the United States and Their Dates (from the Forest History Society website) Text from Davis, Richard C., ed. Encyclopedia of American Forest and Conservation History. New York: Macmillan Publishing Company for the Forest History Society, 1983. Vol. II, pp. 743-788.

Former National Forests of Wyoming